Dark Empire Sourcebook is a supplement published by West End Games in 1993 for the science fiction role-playing Star Wars: The Roleplaying Game.

Contents
In 1987, four years after the release of the third (and at the time, the final) Star Wars movie, Return of the Jedi, West End Games published the popular Star Wars: The Roleplaying Game. However, by 1992, having published many supplements and adventures, West End Games was finding it increasingly difficult to create original material out of the original trilogy of movies; they decided to release a second edition of the game based on other material that had been published. The third supplementary sourcebook to be published for the second edition, Dark Empire Sourcebook, is based upon the Dark Empire comic series by Tom Veitch and Cam Kennedy. 

Dark Empire Sourcebook is a 126-page softcover book written by Michael Allen Horne and Carol Hutchings, with graphics, illustrations and cover art by John Paul Lona, Dave Dorman and Cam Kennedy. The sourcebook gives biographical profiles of notable personalities from the comics, a brief overview of the history of the New Republic, an essay on the Force, and brief profiles of planets and aliens mentioned in the comics. It also includes a 16-page color insert, and several sidebars covering various incidents.

Reception
In the November 1993 edition of Dragon (Issue #199), Rick Swan called sections of this book "dreary" and found that there was an overlap of material previously published in other second edition sourcebooks. He liked the "imaginative sidebars", which he found to be "competently written and liberally illustrated with artwork from the comics". Overall, Swan thought the book "makes an engaging side trip for players on vacation from the New Republic." He gave Dark Empire Sourcebook an average rating of 4 stars out of 6, saying that "players on a budget" could probably get along without it.

Reviews
White Wolf Magazine #38 (1993)

References

Role-playing game supplements introduced in 1993
Star Wars: The Roleplaying Game supplements